Kelid may refer to:
The Key (1987 film), original title Kelid
Kelid (newspaper), Iranian newspaper